Spiked is a 2021 American drama film written and directed by Juan Martinez Vera and starring Aidan Quinn. It is inspired by events in the life of Arizona-based newspaper publisher Joseph Soldwedel, who serves as an executive producer.

Plot 
The story follows John Wilson, a newspaper publisher in a small U.S./Mexico border town who denounces the abuse of power by local law enforcement. Wilson has been at it for years and has made more than a few enemies and stepped on more than a few toes. Following the killing of an immigrant worker, an incident that the police are unwilling to do anything about, the newspaper publisher and his team take on the plight of the family and of the community to find those responsible and bring them to justice. At every turn, his efforts are thwarted by an uncooperative police chief who seems to have her own agenda. Matters escalate when John succumbs to a mysterious illness that threatens his life and his investigation.

Cast
 Aidan Quinn
 Deirdre Lovejoy
 Danay García
 Carlos Gómez
 Wendy Makkena
 Walter Belenky
 Sean Dillingham

Production
Principal photography occurred near Tucson, Arizona in August and September 2019. The indie  film stars Aidan Quinn, best known for his role on the CBS series “Elementary.” Quinn delivers an outstanding performance as John Wilson, a character inspired by real-life events surrounding Arizona-based newspaper publisher Joseph Soldwedel. Soldwedel’s experience fighting injustices as a longtime newspaperman helped lend authenticity to the film, and his financial support gave birth to the project. Soldwedel and his son Brett served as the film’s executive producers

Release
Gravitas Ventures acquired North American distribution rights to the film in February 2021.  The film was released on VOD on March 26, 2021.

References

External links
 

American drama films
American films based on actual events
Films shot in Tucson, Arizona
Films set in Arizona
2020s English-language films
2020s American films